John Luther is a 2022 Indian Malayalam-language Investigating Crime thriller film directed by debutant Abhijith Joseph, starring Jayasurya in the lead role. The principal photography of the film began in November 2021. The film was released on 27 May 2022 to positive reviews.

Plot 
John Luther is an honest and efficient Circle Inspector posted at Munnar. His sister Leena is having an engagement ceremony but as usual he is late because he is a workaholic. He does arrive the night before but leaves soon after the function is over. John who is the Circle Inspector at Devikulam is in charge of the investigation of a motorbike accident that happened the night before where the driver died on the spot but the pillion rider is missing. Using CCTV visuals and photographs taken by the passengers of the bus on which the body fell, they identify the pickup truck which hit the bike. But the pickup driver said he left the pillion rider on the road and does not know what happened to him.

During this time, a school boy also goes missing from around the same area. John is unable to find any links between the two cases but feels they are somehow related. John notices a pickup truck that was on the spot of the first crime scene which did not have number plate on its side. Now police is on the lookout for this truck. 

John confronts two goons from another high profile case he is investigating and ends up in a fight. During the struggle, one of the goons hits John on his left side of hus ears using a tube light and John is seriously injured. At the hospital, doctor informs John that he lost hearing of his left ear completely and has only 20% hearing ability on the right ear. John takes a month's leave and starts using a hearing aid.

When John comes back, another women also goes missing. During that investigation, he finds a house where the pickup truck was spotted by the neighbors. Upon questioning the house owner, he finds the pick up truck and find who drives the truck usually. Venkit is a Tamil daily laborer who just started 4 months back with them. He is now in Chennai trying to sell the house owners truck because his business is doing bad. John questions who brought Venkit to them and it leads to a relative of Venkit called Prasad who retired and went back home due to health reasons. John goes to Tamil Nadu and interrogates Prasad.

Prasad says he always knew Venkit was a psycho. He was a bright medical student who passed MBBS with a rank, but was debarred for practicing medicine during his house surgency thereby killing a girl who was his patient. This made him practice surgery on dead bodies to satisfy the surgeon within. Prasad says he saw the murders. Prasad falls ill and he is admitted to a nearby hospital.

John gets a list of medical students who were debarred and finds out that Venkit was not on the list. But he finds Prasad in that list and understands that Prasad is the real serial killer. He goes back to the hospital to question him. By that time, Prasad manages to make another policeman unconscious and starts performing surgery on him. John and Prasad ends up in a fight in which Prasad severely injures John, but John manages to kill Prasad.

In the final scene of the movie, we see John submitting the closing report of the crimes while his superior officer tells the DGP on the phone that John is going to be assigned to another case.

Cast 
Jayasurya as CI John Luther
Elango Kumaravel as Prasad
Deepak Parambol as SI Felix (John's subordinate)
Siddique as Mathews (John's father)
Athmiya Rajan as Jessie (John Luther's wife)
Drishya Raghunath as Leena (John's sister)
Sreelakshmi as Moly (John's mother)
Sivadas Kannur	as ASI Rajan
Srikanth Murali as SP Krishnakumar IPS
Senthil Krishna as Venkit
Benzi Mathews as Dr. Kiran
Pramod Velliyanad as Varghese
Bitto David as Joby
Vinod as Libin
Aanie Abraham as Geetha
Neethu Chandran as Revathi 
Nimisha as Ancy

Production 
Debutant director Abhijith Joseph approached actor Jayasurya with an investigation thriller and the project got green signal from the award-winning actor. The film was bankrolled by Thomas P Mathew for Alonsa Films with Christeena Thomas as co-producer. Actors Deepak Parambol and Siddique were the first to join the cast and the film completed its first schedule in Vagamon followed by the final schedule at Ernakulam. Director Abhijith Joseph said that the character ‘John Luther’ is not inspired from the iconic ‘DCI John Luther’ played by actor Idris Elba from the British television series Luther. Century Films has acquired the distribution rights of the film. While actor Deepak Parambol completed his dubbing on 30 December 2021, actor Jayasurya started his dubbing on 22 January 2022.

Reception
S.R.Praveen of The Hindu mentioned that "the film is an evenly paced thriller that falters only in the last act, in an attempt to deliver a shocking twist". Anjana George of The Times of India rated the film with 3/5 stars, stating that the film would make every Jayasurya fans happy. The News Minute rated the film with 2.5/5 stars, mentioning that "for nearly two hours, the film flows by almost smoothly, ticking several boxes of a gripping thriller, but in the last 20 minutes, digs its own hole, and falls right into it". Sajin Shrijith of Cinema Express rated the film with 3/5 stars, stated that "the film succeeds in its aim of keeping one engaged for two hours, but when you compare it to films like Drishyam 2 and Antakshari, it comes up short". Princy Alexander of Manoramaonline.com stated that "the movie began promisingly, but wastes a lot of time trying to find closure, thus resulting in a lag product, despite a decent number of twists and turns.

References

External links
 

Films shot in Kochi
2022 directorial debut films
2022 films
2022 thriller films
Indian thriller films
2020s Malayalam-language films